Clarence Blackmon Jr. (December 23, 1942 – March 1, 2011) was an American basketball coach. He was Alabama A&M University's head men's basketball coach from 1972 to 1981 and compiled a 111–119 overall record.

Head coaching record

College

References

1942 births
2011 deaths
Alabama A&M Bulldogs basketball coaches
American men's basketball players
Basketball coaches from Alabama
Basketball players from Alabama
Colorado State Rams men's basketball players
Forwards (basketball)
High school basketball coaches in Alabama
Sportspeople from Tuscaloosa, Alabama
University of South Alabama alumni